The Boonwurrung people are an Aboriginal people of the Kulin nation, who are the traditional owners of the land from the Werribee River to Wilsons Promontory in the Australian state of Victoria. Their territory includes part of what is now the city and suburbs of Melbourne.  They were called the Western Port or Port Philip tribe by the early settlers, and were in alliance with other tribes in the Kulin nation, having particularly strong ties to the Wurundjeri people.

The Registered Aboriginal Party representing the Boonwurrung people is the Bunurong Land Council Aboriginal Corporation.

Language

Boonwurrung is one of the Kulin languages, and belongs to the Pama-Nyungan language family. The ethnonym occasionally used in early writings to refer to the Bunwurrung, namely Bunwurru, is derived from the word bu:n, meaning "no" and wur:u, signifying either "lip" or "speech". This indicates that the Boonwurrung language may not be spoken outside of their Country - their clan's territory.

Country

Its western boundary was set at Werribee. To the southeast, it extended from Mordialloc through to Anderson Inlet, as far as Wilson's Promontory. Inland its borders reached the Dandenong Ranges, and ran eastwards as far as the vicinity of Warragul.

In June 2021, the Bunurong Land Council Aboriginal Corporation and the Wurundjeri Woi Wurrung Cultural Heritage Aboriginal Corporation, both registered Aboriginal Parties, agreed on a redrawing of their traditional boundaries developed by the Victorian Aboriginal Heritage Council. The new borderline runs across the city from west to east, with the CBD, Richmond and Hawthorn included in Wurundjeri land, and Albert Park, St Kilda and Caulfield on Bunurong land. It was agreed that Mount Cottrell, the site of a massacre in 1836 with at least 10 Wathaurong victims, would be jointly managed above the  line. However these new boundaries are disputed by some Wurundjeri and Boonwurrung people, including N'arweet Carolyn Briggs of the Boonwurrung Land and Sea Council.

In Boonwurrung belief, their territory was carved out by the creator Loo-errn as he moved from Yarra Flats down to his final resting place at Wamoon and, as custodians of this marr-ne-beek country, they required outsiders to observe certain ritual prohibitions and to learn their language if the newcomers were to enter their land without harm.

Clan structures 
Communities consisted of six land-owning groups called clans that spoke the Boonwurrung language and were connected through cultural and mutual interests, totems, trading initiatives, and marriage ties. Each had an Arweet, or clan leader.

The clans are:
 Yalukit-willam: East of Werribee River to St Kilda
 Mayone-bulluk: Carrum Carrum Swamp
 Ngaruk-Willam: Brighton, Mordialloc, Dandenong, and the area from Mount Martha to Mount Eliza.
 Yallock-Bullock: Bass River and Tooradin.
 Boonwurrung-Bulluk: Point Nepean to Cape Schank.
 Yowenjerre: Tarwin River.

Access by other clans to land and resources (such as the Birrarung, or Yarra River) was sometimes restricted depending on the state of the resource in question. For example; if a river or creek had been fished regularly throughout the fishing season and fish supplies were down, fishing was limited or stopped entirely by the clan who owned that resource until fish were given a chance to recover. During this time, other resources were utilised for food. This ensured the sustained use of the resources available to them. As with most other Kulin territories, penalties such as spearings were enforced upon trespassers.

Boonwurrung moieties classified people either as Bunjil, that is eaglehawk or Waang, namely raven.

History and culture

Traditional life 
Information on traditional life has been passed down by Boonwurrung people from one generation to the next, and was also recorded by European settlers and administrators.

The Yalukit-willam clan of the Boonwurrung were semi-nomadic hunter gatherers who moved around to seasonal food sources in their territory to take advantage of seasonably available food resources. Their hunting equipment and techniques had been highly developed to the environment and they had a highly detailed knowledge of their Country. This knowledge was passed from one generation to the next. They had to work only about five hours a day. Dogs were important and ceremonially buried.

The Boonwurrung people have oral histories that recount in detail the flooding of Port Phillip Bay ten-thousand years ago. The boundaries of Boonwurrung territory are defined by further floods 5000 years ago. Prior to this time, the bay was scrub-filled and passable on foot, and the Boonwurrung people hunted kangaroo and possums on it.

Food and hunting 
The Yalukit-willam would spend up to a few weeks in one spot, depending on the water and food supply. Major camps were often set up close to permanent fresh water, leaving archaeological evidence of the places they lived. These archaeological sites include surface scatters, shell middens, isolated artefacts and burials.

Men were the primary hunters. They hunted kangaroos, possums, kangaroo rats, bandicoots, wombats and lizards. They also caught fish and eels and collected shellfish. Some Boonwurrung people made seasonal trips in canoes to French Island, where they could gather swan eggs. In coastal and swamp areas there was plenty of bird life to hunt, including ducks and swans. There were abundant eels, yabbies, and fish in Stony and Kororoit creeks, and the Yarra River. Men were experts at spearing eels and Robinson notes in his diary in 1841 two men catching 40lbs of eel 'in a very short time'. The coast provided saltwater fish, mussels, cockles and small crabs.

Women were primarily gatherers. Murnong (or yam daisy) was a favourite food. Others were the black wattle gum, the pith of tree ferns, native cherries, kangaroo apples and various fungi. Murnong grew all year was best eaten in spring. Tubers were collected in vast amounts in string bags. Fresh murnong could be eaten raw, or if less fresh, murnong could be roasted or baked in earth ovens. Murnong used to grow in great amounts along the Kororoit Creek and other creeks in the area and covered the plain to the west. These murnong fields were destroyed by the introduction of sheep. Scholar Bruce Pascoe attributes the widespread fields of murrnong in certain areas to active farming by Aboriginal peoples. Women collected large quantities of tadpoles which were cooked beneath a bed of hot coals.

Robinson's diary describes how the Yalukit-willam caught emus and restrained their dingos.

Early European invasion 

Initial contact was made in February 1801 when Lieutenant Murray and his crew from the Lady Nelson came ashore for fresh water near present-day Sorrento. A wary exchange of spears and stone axes for shirts, mirrors and a steel axe, ended when the crew of the Lady Nelson panicked, resulting in spears flying, musket shots and the use of the ship's cannon, wounding several fleeing Boonwurrung people. The following month, Captain Milius from the French ship Naturaliste, in the Baudin expedition, danced alone on a beach at Western Port for the natives, in a much more peaceful contact.

Just before and overlapping the period of British exploration and settlement, the Boonwurrung were involved in a long-running dispute with the Gunai/Kurnai people from Gippsland. According to William Barak, the last traditional elder of the Wurundjeri people, the conflict was a dispute over resources, which resulted in heavy casualties being suffered by the Boonwurrung. Many Gunnai raids occurred to abduct Boonwurrung women. The Yowengerra had almost been completely annihilated by 1836, largely as a result of attacks from the Gunai. During 1833–34, around 60–70 Bunurong people, if a report has been correctly interpreted, may have been killed in a raid by Gunai when they were camped to the north of Carrum Carrum Swamp.

Dispossession

The Boonwurrung people, living primarily along the Port Phillip and Western Port coast, may have had their livelihoods affected by European seal hunters. The sealers' abduction of Boonwurrung women and taken to Bass Strait Islands and Tasmania may have caused inter-tribal conflicts, and by analogy, this may also apply to the Boonwurrung, whose coastlands were visited by sealers. A report by Jules Dumont d'Urville in 1830 attributed the absence of Boonwurrung on Phillip Island, which was a camp for sealers, as due to the latter's behavior. As late as 1833, nine Woiwurrung and Boonwurrung women, and a boy, Yonki Yonka, were kidnapped and ferried across to the sealers' Bass Strait island bases. Contact with sealers would have exposed the coastal tribes to European diseases, and this would have exercised a heavy impact on demographics, and the economic and social ties binding the Wurundjeri and Boonwurrung peoples, as would the possible effects of infectious diseases contracted from these sealers.

James Fleming, one of the party of surveyor Charles Grimes in HMS Cumberland who explored the Maribyrnong River and the Yarra River as far as Dights Falls in February 1803, reported smallpox scars on several aboriginal people he met, suggesting that a smallpox epidemic might have swept through the tribes around Port Philip before 1803, reducing the population. Broome puts forward that two epidemics of smallpox decimated the population of the Kulin tribes by perhaps killing half each time in the 1790s and again around 1830. This theory has been challenged, however, by modern historical diagnosticians, who argue that the observed symptoms in the early ethnographical literature are compatible with impetigo and ringworm.

One particularly notable person at the time of European settlement in Victoria was Derrimut, a Boonwurrung Elder, who informed early European settlers in October 1835 of an impending attack by clans from the Woiwurrung group. The colonists armed themselves, and the attack was averted. Benbow and Billibellary, from the Wurundjeri, also acted to protect the colonists as part of their duty of hospitality. Derrimut later became very disillusioned and died in the Benevolent Asylum at the age of about 54 years in 1864. A few colonists erected a tombstone to Derrimut in Melbourne General Cemetery in his honour.

By 1839, the Boonwurrung had been reduced to 80–90 people, with only 4 of 19 children under four years old, from a probable pre-contact population of greater than 500 people. By 1850 Protector William Thomas estimated just 28 Bunurong people living on Boonwurrung land.

In 1852, the Boonwurrung were allocated  at Mordialloc Creek while the Woiwurrung gained 782 hectares along the Yarra at Warrandyte. The Aboriginal reserves were never staffed by whites and were not permanent camps, but acted as distribution depots where rations and blankets were distributed, with the intention being to keep the tribes away from the growing settlement of Melbourne. The Aboriginal Protection Board revoked these two reserves in 1862–1863, considering them now too close to Melbourne.

In March 1863, after three years of upheaval, the surviving Kulin leaders, among them Simon Wonga and William Barak, led forty Wurundjeri, Taungurung (Goulburn River) and Boonwurrung people over the Black Spur and squatted on a traditional camping site on Badger Creek near Healesville and requested ownership of the site. This became Coranderrk Station, named after the Woiwurrung word for the Victorian Christmas bush. Coranderrk was closed in 1924 and its occupants were moved to Lake Tyers in Gippsland.

Law and war
Great enmity existed in particular between the Boonwurrung and the eastern Gunai, who were later deemed responsible for playing a role in the drastic reduction of the tribe's population.

Injury or death to a tribal member usually resulted in a conference to assess the facts, and, where thought unlawful, revenge was taken. In 1839, after one or two Boonwurrung/Woiwurrung were killed, a party of 15 men left for Geelong in order to retaliate against the malefactors, the Wathaurong.
In 1840, the Boonwurrung became convinced that a man from a tribe in Echuca had used sorcery to ordain the death of one of their warriors, whose name had been sung while a possum bone discarded after a Boonwurrung meal, and encased in a kangaroo's leg bone, was roasted. Shortly afterward the named Boonwurrung man died, and the tribe revenged itself on the first Echuca tribesman who then came to visit their territory. It was arranged by word of mouth, passing from Echuca through the Nirababaluk and Wurundjeri, for a meeting to have justice done at Merri Creek. Nine or ten of the killed Echuca tribesman's kinsmen threw spears and boomerangs at the Boonwurrung warrior, armed with a shield, until he was wounded in the flank by a reed-spear. An elder of another, observing tribe, the Barababaraba, called it a day, the ordeal ended, and all celebrated a grand corroboree.

Boonwurrung Dreaming

 Bunjil and Pallian Creation Story: Bunjil is the Creator spirit of the Kulin People.
 Birrarung Creation Story: formation of the Birrarung River.

Notable people

 Jack Charles (1943– 2022), actor.
 Derrimut (c. 1810 – 28 May 1864), arweet – headman of the Boonwurrung.
 Carolyn Briggs 
 Louisa Briggs
 Maree Clarke (artist)

Alternative names
 Boonerwrung
 Bunuron
 Bunurong, Bunwurrung, Boonwerung, Boonoorong and Bururong
 Bunwurru
 Putnaroo, Putmaroo
 Thurung (an eastern tribal exonym for the Bunjurong, meaning tiger snakes, a metaphor indicating the sneaky way they set up ambushes against the eastern tribes.)
 Toturin (a Gunai term for 'black snake, used for several western Boonwurrung tribes.

See also
 Australian Aboriginal enumeration
 Possum-skin cloak

Notes

Citations

Sources

External links 
 Bunurong Land Council Aboriginal Corporation

Aboriginal peoples of Victoria (Australia)
History of Victoria (Australia)
Kulin nation
Port Phillip